While rights have advanced significantly since the start of the 21st century, lesbian, gay, bisexual and transgender (LGBT) people in Georgia still face some legal challenges that non-LGBT people do not experience. Georgia is one of only a few countries in the former Soviet space (others being the Baltic states, Moldova, and Ukraine) that directly prohibits discrimination against all LGBT people in legislation, labor-related or otherwise. Since 2012, Georgian law has considered crimes committed on the grounds of one's sexual orientation or gender identity an aggravating factor in prosecution. Despite this, homosexuality is still considered a major deviation from the highly traditional Orthodox Christian values prevalent in the country, where public discussions of sexuality in general tend to be viewed in a highly negative light. Consequently, homosexuals are often targets of abuse and physical violence, often actively encouraged by religious leaders. According to the 2021 International Social Survey Programme (ISSIP) study, 84% of the Georgian public thinks that sexual relations between two adults of the same sex are always wrong, which is the highest score in Europe.

The Government tries to bring the country's human rights record in line with the demands of Georgia's European and Euro-Atlantic integration. Former Georgian Prime Minister Bidzina Ivanishvili has stated that "sexual minorities are the same citizens as we are... [and that] the society will gradually get used to it." Since 2014, discrimination based on sexual orientation and gender identity has been outlawed.

On May 17, 2013, the rally organized by the pro-LGBT NGO Identoba on the International Day Against Homophobia was disrupted by tens of thousands counter-protesters, with organizers being evacuated by the police in buses. In 2014, the Georgian Orthodox Church declared May 17 "a day of family sanctity" and promised to protect family values. Since then, the Day of the Holiness of the Family is celebrated every year with rallies in Tbilisi and other cities. In 2019, a first pride parade was announced by the NGO Tbilisi Pride. The event was initially cancelled due to security concerns, although later a small rally was held outside the Interior Ministry by the activists, which lasted only 30 minutes amid reports that the anti-pride groups were on their way to disrupt the rally. On 5 July, 2021, the attempt to hold a pride parade on the Tbilisi's main street, Rustaveli Avenue, was frustrated by tens of thousands counter-protesters, which besieged the office of Tbilisi Pride. In result of counter-protests, the planned pride parade was cancelled.

History and legality of same-sex sexual activity

Historically, the homosexual acts were condemned by the Georgian Orthodox Church. Throughout the 11th century the Church was used by the feudal aristocrats to gain wealth and power and to defy the crown: aristocrats had been appointing under-age and uneducated offspring as bishops, who in turn ordained unqualified ministers, who sanctioned illicit marriages, indulged in sodomy, and so on. The 1104 Church Synod at Ruisi cathedral and Urbnisi monastery, convened by David IV, aimed to end abuses in the Church. As a result, the longest and most adamant article of the memorandum summarizing the synod's resolutions denounced sodomy as the foulest sin, which "brought down the high reign of the Persians and the eternal reign of the Romans to the level of wild beasts".

Homosexuality had been banned in Georgia under the Czarist rule. After the February Revolution, which saw the monarchy in Russia being overthrown, the Czarist Criminal Code was abolished, making homosexuality legal. The ban in Georgia was reintroduced in 1924, even though the Soviet policy on homosexuality in these years was considerably mild, as Lenin and other Bolsheviks did not consider homosexuality to be a crime, and even deemed Czarist policy toward homosexuals oppressive and campaigned against what they thought to be "bourgeois morality". Moreover, no ban was introduced on homosexuality in Russia after the October Revolution. However, many Bolsheviks thought that adopting a ban on homosexuality for Caucasian nations to be a necessary act in order to overcome "cultural backwardness". Views toward homosexuality changed radically while Stalin consolidated his power in the 1930s. Stalin proceeded to introduce a nationwide ban on male homosexuality in 1933, with up to five years of hard labor in prison. The precise reason for the law is still in dispute. The leadership of the Soviet Union explained this shift in policy by Soviet medical researches, which concluded that homosexuality was a mental disease. Soviet authorities also described homosexuality as a remnant of the capitalist society, thus declaring homosexuals to be counter-revolutionary and enemies of the people. Some historians have suggested that Joseph Stalin's enactment of the anti-gay law was, like his prohibition on abortion, an attempt to increase the Soviet birthrate. The article outlawing homosexuality was also used by Soviet authorities against dissident movements, with many activists being arrested on trumped-up sodomy charges.

After Georgia obtained its independence from the Soviet Union in 1991, the aforesaid practice fell out of use and there are no recorded cases of sodomy article being openly used against political opponents ever since. Despite this, the freedom of same-sex sexual activity was not officially enshrined in the law until 2000, when the Georgian Government put in place an amended criminal code to meet the standards set forth by the Council of Europe and the European Convention on Human Rights.

The age of consent for both heterosexual and homosexual sex stands at 16 years of age as set by the Georgian Penal Code, articles 140 and 141.

Recognition of same-sex relationships
Georgia does not recognize same-sex unions, either in the form of marriage or civil unions. Since 2018, the Constitution of Georgia has defined marriage as a union of a woman and a man for the purpose of founding a family. All the same, there is an open discourse to recognize same-sex unions by introducing civil partnership for couples.

2016 constitutional reform crisis

The proposal to define marriage as a union of a man and a woman in the Constitution of Georgia was made by Prime Minister Irakli Garibashvili in March, 2014. The initiative came as the government tabled anti-discrimination bill, which was Georgia's precondition to get a visa free regime with the European Union. The Prime Minister stated that the amendment was necessary to avoid "misinterpretation" of the anti-discriminaiton law. "Though according to the current legislation, a family is understood as a union between a man and a woman, I think it should be written in the Constitution too," Garibashvili said, "I would like to stress that the [anti-discrimination] law does not create any new right for anyone. It does not grant any type of privileges to any group of society, neither takes away any right. The law only ensures that all could equally enjoy the rights which are ensured by Georgian legislation and the Constitution". 

Critics have characterized Garibashvili's proposal as a move to "appease the conservative Georgian voters". The anti-discrimination law was adopted by the Parliament in May, 2014. It caused major opposition from the conservative part of the Georgian society. Head of the Georgian Orthodox Church, Patriarch Ilia II said that the law "will not be accepted by the believers" and added that "legalizing illegality is a huge sin". The Article 1 of the law specifies various forms of discrimination including gender identity and sexual orientation. Its language on sexual orientation and gender identity was viewed by the Church as "legalization of sodomy". They campaigned for the law not to specify the forms of discrimination and warned the government of losing public support. 

Although Georgia's Civil Code already defines marriage as a heterosexual union, thus effectively preventing same-sex marriages, the Constitution of Georgia was gender-neutral, specifying that "Marriage shall be based upon equality of rights and free will of spouses." A lawsuit was filed with the Constitutional Court to remove a passage in the Civic Code which defines marriage as "a union of a man and a woman". The gender-neutral wording in constitution caused conservative elements in the Georgian society to worry that the Civil Code might be struck down in the courts, potentially paving a way for same-sex marriages. 

In November, 2015, Zviad Tomaradze, head of the conservative organization Georgia's Demographic Society XXI, prepared the draft bill to amend the Constitution to define marriage as a union between a man and a woman. In March, 2016, 80 MPs proposed a constitutional amendment to the Parliament. The bill was drafted by the members of the ruling Georgian Dream party and the opposition Free Democrats party. According to the Constitution of Georgia, the Parliament should pass an amendment to the constitution if it is supported by 3/4 of the total number of the Members of Parliament (113 MPs). The bill failed to garner sufficient number of votes due to lack of support from much of the parliamentary opposition.

Meanwhile, the conservative activists gathered two hundred thousand signatures in order to amend the constitution through referendum. The Central Election Commission of Georgia gave its approval to the proposal; however, it failed to get permission from the President Giorgi Margvelashvili. President announced that Georgia would not hold a referendum on whether to ban same-sex marriage in the country's Constitution. Prime Minister Giorgi Kvirikashvili promised that the Georgian Dream coalition would amend the constitution to define marriage as a union between a woman and a man if his party gets enough seats in the upcoming 2016 parliamentary election.

In the election, the Georgian Dream won 115 seats, an increase of 30 seats, and proposed a constitutional amendment. The proposal caused a backlash from Georgian civil society and human rights organizations, which assailed the legislation as way of politicizing this sensitive issue and capitalizing on popular societal prejudices.

The constitutional amendment caused a split within the ruling coalition itself, with members of the liberal-leaning Republican Party of Georgia campaigning against the initiative. 

After a month of public consultation, the proposal was considered in Parliament. Public meetings on the ban were scheduled from mid-March until 15 April in various cities throughout the country. The constitutional amendment was passed by the Parliament on 26 September 2017, establishing that marriage exists solely as "a union between a woman and a man for the purpose of creating a family". The constitutional amendment went into effect after the 2018 Georgian presidential election and the inauguration of President Salome Zurabishvili on 16 December 2018.

Civil partnerships
In April 2017, several human rights organisations called on the Georgian Government to legalise same-sex civil partnerships.

In April 2018, the Georgian Ombudsman urged the Government to allow civil partnerships for same-sex couples. Citing Oliari and Others v. Italy, he reminded the Government that not recognising same-sex relationships is a violation of the European Convention on Human Rights. He also criticised the constitutional amendment banning same-sex marriage, arguing that it would "increase hatred".

Discrimination protections
Since 2006, Article 2(3) of the Labor Code has prohibited discrimination on the basis of sexual orientation in employment relations.

According to the amended Georgian Criminal Code (since 2012), committing crimes against individuals based on sexual orientation, among other things, is an aggravating factor that should result in tougher sentences during prosecution.

On 2 May 2014, the Parliament approved an anti-discrimination law, banning all forms of discrimination based on sexual orientation and gender identity. It took effect upon publication, on 7 May 2014. Article 1 of the Law of Georgia on the Elimination of All Forms of Discrimination reads as follows:

Hate crime laws
In spite of the legislative amendment to article 53 of the Criminal Code of Georgia, which ensures that bias motivated by the sexual orientation or gender identity of a victim may be taken into account as an aggravating circumstance when determining sanctions, there are still no official statistics about crimes conducted on sexual orientation or gender identity grounds in the country. According to the registered cases and conducted studies, it has become clear that the law prohibiting hate crime is not efficient.

A study on discrimination among LGBT people in Georgia entitled "From Prejudice To Equality: study of societal attitudes, knowledge and information regarding the LGBT community and their rights" conducted in 2012 by the Women's Initiatives Supporting Group (WISG) revealed the following: 32% of surveyed respondents had at least once experienced physical violence and 89.93% had experienced psychological violence. On average, among the 134 respondents who had experienced psychological violence, 73.13% had become victims three or more times, 13.43% had experienced it twice, and 13.43% once. All six respondents from the 16-18 age group had admitted that at school they had often become victims of bullying. Among 48 respondents, who had been victims of physical violence, 73% had never reported to police. Among the reasons for not reporting to police the following was mentioned ineffectiveness of police (21.62%), fear of homophobic treatment (29.73%), and failure by the police to treat the matter in a serious manner (21.62%). Among those who had reported to police, 46.15% were dissatisfied with this decision, as they experienced a homophobic reaction from the police, 30% admitted that the police acted in a friendly manner, while 23.08% stated that they were treated neutrally.

Gender identity and expression

Since 2008, transgender people in Georgia can change documents and personal names to reflect their preferred gender after having undergone sex reassignment surgery.

Discrimination on the basis of gender identity is outlawed.

Blood donation
In July 2017, Georgia's Constitutional Court lifted a ban on gay and bisexual men donating blood, ruling that it was unconstitutional. In its ruling, the court pointed out that modern technologies allow for the detection of HIV/AIDS in donations, making a ban unnecessary.

Previously, on 4 February 2014, the Constitutional Court also declared the ban unconstitutional. The ban stated that homosexuality was a restricting factor for donating blood. In response, the Health Ministry changed the wording to "men who have sex with men".

LGBT freedom of expression
An event in 2006 that was supposed to promote tolerance and cultural dialogue was canceled after rumours spread that it was supposedly a gay parade. The head of Georgian Orthodox Church, Patriarch Ilya, stated that any kind of rally which features LGBT people is "offensive".

On 17 May 2012, Georgian LGBT organisation Identoba (იდენტობა) organized a peaceful march in observance of the International Day Against Homophobia, Transphobia and Biphobia. This was the first public march in support of LGBT equality in Georgia. The march was discontinued soon after it started, however, because the marchers claimed they were assaulted by religious counter-demonstrators, including representatives of the Georgian Orthodox Church and radical Christian groups. Police intervened to protect the march participants only after the fighting had already broken out and arrested some of the alleged victims instead of the perpetrators.

Amnesty International criticized the Georgian Government for failing to effectively protect the march. On 14 January 2013, LGBT organization Identoba and the participants of the march filed an application against Georgia with the European Court of Human Rights. The application claims that Georgia failed to effectively protect the participants of LGBT march and did not investigate or adequately punish the perpetrators.

The 2013 observance of International Day against Homophobia was also met with aggression. LGBT activists scheduled a rally to mark the occasion; however, it never took place. Thousands of anti-LGBT protestors, led by Georgian Orthodox priests, held a counter-demonstration. Protestors carried images of Jesus and signs reading "Stop promoting homosexual propaganda in Georgia" and "We don't need Sodom and Gomorrah." Some women waved so called symbolic bundles of nettle to "beat the gay people", including one woman who labeled the rally a "gay parade" held by "sick people ... against our traditions and ... morals" and proclaiming her readiness to fight. Despite a heavy police presence, the protestors stormed the barricades protecting the pro-LGBT rally. At least 28 people were slightly injured, with many trapped in buses and nearby shops and homes that were attacked by the protestors. According to a video from the scene, the police saved one young man from an apparent lynching by several dozen people. According to the Georgian Young Lawyers Association, however, the state "failed to ensure conduct of the scheduled event ... and thus [the] rights of rally participants to assembly and manifestation were grossly violated." Observers indicated that the police allowed Orthodox clergymen and other demonstrators to enter the barricaded area and were, in private communications, cynical and humiliating to the rally participants. Prime Minister Bidzina Ivanishvili, along with other leading officials, condemned the violence. He said, "The right to gather peacefully and to freely express one's opinion is fundamental to our democracy. Every Georgian citizen benefits fully and equally from this right. Acts of violence, discrimination and restriction of the rights of others will not be tolerated, and any perpetrators of such acts will be dealt with according to the law."

Besides Identoba, Equality Movement (თანასწორობის მოძრაობა) is another Georgian LGBT advocacy group striving for equal human rights for LGBT people.

In February 2019, it was announced that the first LGBT Pride Week and Tbilisi Pride would take place from 18 to 23 June in Tbilisi. The event would include a "March of Dignity", which would be held on 23 June, and according to the organisers "it will not take the form of a holiday nor of a carnival because we are not in the mood for a celebration now". Ultra-right groups, such as the Georgian March organization, responded by threatening to violently attack the participants. Sandro Bregadze, one of the leaders of the organization, said "they will have to march over our dead bodies if they decide to hold this celebration of perversion". On 31 May 2019, just two weeks before the planned event, the Ministry of Internal Affairs of Georgia said that it was "impossible" for Tbilisi Pride to go ahead in the planned locations in the city centre "due to safety risks", and recommended a closed event indoors at a facility such as a stadium or a club. Civil society organisations including the Open Society Georgia Foundation, Human Rights Education and the Monitoring Center and Georgian Young Lawyer's Association called upon law enforcers to "take adequate measures to secure security of participants in peaceful assembly", and said that "It's the State's obligation to ensure timely and adequate protection [of Tbilisi Pride participants] from possible violence". They called the ministry's actions "humiliating, anti-state, and anti-constitutional". The Equality Movement, which is the organizer of Tbilisi Pride, said they had been experiencing pressure for the past weeks from an "unidentified government official" to cancel the march. The organisers said that "he tried to make us change or abolish our plans by intimidating us. It is not the first time that the government has resorted to intimidation and terror towards LGBT people". The organisers accused the authorities of trying to "hide LGBT people" instead of tackling the hatred and aggression towards them. They promised that they would carry on working on various events despite the ministry's position. On 20 June 2019, following riots, Tbilisi Pride postponed the march due to take place on 23 June. Organisers said that "in this political situation we cannot allow ourselves to further escalate the tensions in the country. We will not give pro-Russian, neo-fascist groups the opportunity to weaken Georgia's statehood. However, on 8 July 2019, about 20 to 40 demonstrators, including human rights activists and members of the LGBT community, held an impromptu, small scale pride parade for about 30 minutes outside the Ministry of Internal Affairs while holding signs and rainbow flags and flying a drone that carried a rainbow flag over protestors who had gathered in front of the Parliament. Reports suggested information concerning the march was leaked online, raising security concerns, as several violent radicals, including clerics, nationalist groups and their supporters gathered at several locations in Tbilisi to prevent the march from taking place. Far-right anti-gay groups planned to disperse protesters, however, the march had already been completed when they arrived at the place. Opponents spend the whole night on central Rustaveli Avenue protesting against Tbilisi Pride and demanding the abolishment of the anti-discrimination law and introducing a law banning what they called "perverted behavior".

On 17 May 2019, after warnings from far-right groups that anti-homophobic demonstrations would be met with violence, activists abstained from holding a demonstration in Tbilisi for that year's International Day Against Homophobia, Transphobia and Biphobia over safety concerns and decided to limit themselves to online campaigns only, and hung a lone rainbow flag in Tbilisi. Meanwhile, hundreds of priests, churchgoers and far-right groups took to the streets to protest "sodomy". Some of them came out to celebrate "Family Purity Day", a holiday created by the Georgian Orthodox Church in 2014, a year after thousands of people led by priests attacked several dozen LGBT rights demonstrators in the city.

Social attitudes
In October 2007, one of the contestants on the reality TV show Bar-4 outed himself on public television. After reportedly receiving a call from the head of the Georgian Orthodox Church Ilia II of Georgia, the Georgian President allegedly pressured the producers of the show into evicting the gay participant from the TV program.

According to a 2009 social attitude questionnaire, homosexuals were named as one of the most disliked groups in society – with most respondents preferring an alcoholic rather than homosexual colleague at work. According to the same questionnaires, an estimated 91.5 percent of Georgians thought that homosexuality is "never acceptable".

A 2016 opinion poll identified that negative attitudes towards LGBTI people were still dominant in Georgia. Respondents expressed more negative attitudes towards bisexual and gender non-conforming men than bisexual and gender non-conforming women. Attitudes towards lesbians and gay persons were equally negative. The study showed that adverse attitudes towards lesbian and gay people had various predictors. Biphobic attitudes in Georgian society were stronger than homophobic sentiment. The higher level of biphobia was determined by bisexuality being perceived as a "fluid, unstable orientation". In terms of transphobia, sex constitutes a significant predictor: men were more inclined to express negative attitudes towards transgender and gender non-conforming persons than women. Negative attitudes towards select groups varied by village/town/capital, gender, age, level of contact/acquaintance with the LGBT community, and level of knowledge about homosexuality. Homo/bi/transphobic attitudes were largely determined by respondents' perceptions of traditional gender roles, and the level of right-wing authoritarianism and religious fundamentalism (the degree of influence evidently varies among individual groups). Respondents ranking high on the right-wing authoritarianism and religious fundamentalism scales far more frequently exhibited negative attitudes towards LGBT community members. The more rigid the respondents' understanding of traditional gender roles, the higher they rank on the homophobia, biphobia and transphobia scales.

A 2016 Pew Research Center poll found that 90% of Georgians believed homosexuality is “morally wrong”, with only prostitution being more unacceptable.

In October 2017, Georgian football player Guram Kashia expressed support for LGBT rights, appearing at a match in the Netherlands with a rainbow armband as part of National Coming Out Day. Far-right groups held rowdy protests and violent riots in front of the Georgian Football Federation, demanding Kashia's expulsion from the national team. 8 people were arrested at the riots. Other fundamentalists, including singer Gia Korkotashvili, appeared on national television, screaming prophecies of an imminent gay apocalypse. However, many supported Kashia's right to freedom of speech including many other athletes and politicians. These included President Giorgi Margvelashvili. Kakha Kaladze, a retired footballer, former Deputy Prime Minister and newly elected Mayor of Tbilisi, expressed support for Kashia, saying: "We are a democratic country. Everyone has the right to express their views, regardless of their nationality, sexual orientation or religion." In 2018, Kashia, who had since been elected the captain of the Georgian national football team, received the UEFA #EqualGame Award for his support of the LGBT community. In response to winning the award, Kashia said "I believe in equality for everyone, no matter what you believe in, who you love or who you are."

In the October 2017 local elections, Nino Bolkvadze, an openly gay candidate, ran for a Tbilisi City Assembly seat as a member of the Republican Party. Bolkvadze was the first openly gay candidate to run for public office in Georgia. While her candidacy was ultimately unsuccessful, her run was reported as a significant shift in the conservative country.

In 2017, the Prosecutor's Office examined 86 alleged hate crimes, 12 of which were based on sexual orientation and 37 on gender identity. The Public Defender's 2018 report said violence against LGBT people, whether in the family or in public spaces, was a serious problem in Georgia, and that the Government has been unable to respond to this challenge. The report stated that the Public Defender had received numerous complaints regarding homophobic attitudes from law enforcement officials.

In 2018, a poll by the National Democratic Institute (NDI) showed that only 23% of the Georgian population believed that the protection of LGBT rights was important, while 44% thought the protection of LGBT rights was not important and 26% had a neutral attitude. The results showed a 2% gain in support for LGBT people compared to 2015, when 21% of the population considered the protection of their rights as important.

The 2019 NDI poll saw a 4% increase in support for LGBT rights across all groups of society with 27% of Georgians saying that protecting the rights of queer people is important. Worth noting, for the first time ever, more young people aged 18–35 said that queer rights are important than not, with 38% expressing support, 36% saying that LGBT rights are not important and 21% remaining neutral. In general, the support of LGBT rights has been increasing among the general public over the past several years.

In December 2018, Beso Danelia, a politician from the conservative party Democratic Movement – United Georgia who used a homophobic slur against Levan Berianidze, an LGBT rights activist, on TV, was issued a fine of ₾1 ($0.37) by the Tbilisi City Court. The incident occurred in April 2016 on Kavkasia TV. Berianidze, who heads the local LGBT rights group Equality Movement, claimed Danelia insulted them and then tried to physically attack him but was held back by staff at the television company. They appealed to the court, demanding compensation of ₾500 ($190) from Danelia for moral damages. In its ruling, the court upheld Berianidze's claim that their dignity was violated by the homophobic slur, but ordered Danelia to pay only ₾1, the minimum fine. Although the ruling set a precedent, as it was the first time a fine had been issued on these grounds, the activist argued the ruling could give the green light for others to express homophobic hate, and said that the court had ridiculed them in their judgement. They said "the court's ruling is basically mocking, and it will encourage homophobic behaviour, because they will know that it will cost them only ₾1". They also said he was considering appealing the ruling.

In December 2018, the Tbilisi City Court ruled in the case of a 15-year-old boy who had attacked an LGBT rights activist on the International Day Against Homophobia, Transphobia and Biphobia. The 15-year-old punched LGBT activist Nika Gorgiladze in the face as he gave a speech about love in front of the Government Chancellery building on 17 May. The assailant was immediately detained by police as he attempted to flee the scene. The prosecution brought charges of persecution with violence, punishable by a fine, house arrest or up to three years' imprisonment. However, the court decided to enroll the boy in a juvenile diversion programme, meaning he might not be prosecuted as an adult and would instead be observed by a social worker.

According to the recent International Social Survey Programme (ISSIP) study, 84% of the Georgian public thinks that sexual relations between two adults of the same sex are always wrong, which is the highest score in Europe. Study also determined that how strongly someone evaluates the importance of religion in their lives is not correlated with their views on same-sex relationships.

In a poll by NDI from August 2022, 38% of the respondents considered the protection of LGBT rights important (tied with respondents considering the protection of LGBT rights not important), marking a continuous trend of increasing support towards LGBT rights.

Notable Georgian LGBTQ personalities

Summary table

See also

Human rights in Georgia
2013 Tbilisi anti-homophobia rally protests
2021 attack on Tbilisi Pride
LGBT rights in Europe
LGBT rights in Asia
Same-sex union court cases

References

Human rights in Georgia (country)
Georgia
Politics of Georgia (country)
LGBT in Georgia (country)
Georgia